Carlos Cruz may refer to:

Carlos Cruz (boxer) (1937–1970), Dominican lightweight world champion
Carlos Cruz (television presenter) (born 1942), Portuguese presenter and convicted paedophile
Juan-Carlos Cruz (born 1962), celebrity chef on Food Network
Carlos de la Cruz, Cuban-American businessman
Carlos Roberto da Cruz Júnior (born 1986), Brazilian footballer
Carlos Cruz González (1930–2018), Spanish artist
Carlos Cruz (actor) (born 1960), Venezuelan actor
Carlos Da Cruz (born 1974), French road bicycle racer

See also
Carlos Cruz-Diez (1923–2019), Venezuelan artist